The 2020 Ball State Cardinals football team represented Ball State University during the 2020 NCAA Division I FBS football season. The Cardinals were led by fifth-year head coach Mike Neu and played their home games at Scheumann Stadium in Muncie, Indiana. They competed as members of the West Division of the Mid-American Conference.

In a season impacted by the COVID-19 pandemic, the Cardinals played to a 5–1 record in a limited regular-season schedule. The team then defeated Buffalo in the conference championship game. The season ended with a victory over San Jose State in the Arizona Bowl for the first bowl game victory in program history.

Schedule
Ball State had games scheduled against Indiana, Maine, and Michigan, which were canceled due to the COVID-19 pandemic. On July 28, it was announced that Ball State had added Iowa State to the schedule. Soon after, the MAC decided to cancel its season, followed by the same announcements from the Big Ten Conference, Pac-12 Conference, and Mountain West Conference.

On September 25, the Mid-American Conference changed course, playing a six-week scheduled football season starting the week of November 4.

Schedule Source:

Game summaries

Miami

Eastern Michigan

Northern Illinois

Toledo

Central Michigan

Western Michigan

Buffalo (MAC Championship Game)

San Jose State (Arizona Bowl)

References

Ball State
Ball State Cardinals football seasons
Mid-American Conference football champion seasons
Arizona Bowl champion seasons
Ball State Cardinals football